Alligator Pie, first published in 1974, is a book of children's poetry written by Dennis Lee and illustrated by Frank Newfeld. It won the Book of the Year award from the Canadian Library Association in 1975. The book had multiple adaptations and led to Lee being named "Canada's Father Goose".

Poems

Alligator Pie
Wiggle to the Laundromat
Singa Songa
Bouncing Song
Street Song
Mumbo, Jumbo
Willaby Wallaby woo
Lying on Things
Rattlesnake Skipping Song
Bed Song
In Kamloops
Billy Batter
Ookpik
Bump on Your Thumb
The Special Person
Like a Giant in a Towel
Flying Out of Holes
William Lyon Mackenzie King
Tony Baloney
Skyscraper
Tricking
I Found a Silver Dollar
If You Should Meet
Higgledy Piggeldy
Thinking in Bed
Nicholas Grouch
Psychapoo
On Tuesdays I Polish my Uncle
The Fishes of Kempenfelt Bay
Kahshe or Chicoutimi
Tongue Twister
The Hockey Game
Peter Rabbit
The Friends
The Sitter and the Butter and the Better Batter Fritter
Windshield Wipers

Publication

One of his daughters wanted to be read a poem before she went to sleep and Lee "knew lots of nursery rhymes but none of them seemed right for a small Canadian about to go off to sleep" which contributed to him writing the collection. The first people to listen to the poems were Lee's two daughters, who did not like that the poems had no pictures although they liked the "silly words". It took Lee nine years to finish the book. It was published in 1974 by Macmillan Publishers and Frank Newfeld illustrated the poems. The poetry has a "Canadian context".

Adaptations
Theatre Passe Muraille has produced stage adaptations of the collection since 1974. The plays were performed by "weaving the characters and stories together with bits of dialogue, music and movement." The Vancouver East Cultural Centre held the Theatre Passe Muraille's play in December 1984, and the organization invited children in the Lower Mainland to send in their own Alligator Pie art. The submissions could be from children in preschool to 6th grade with any type of two-dimensional art being accepted.

In 1991, Alligator Pie was made into a short film with puppeteering by Jani Lauzon. CBC Television played the film on its evening Family Hour programming block in 1992. The film is mostly in live action, but it also has claymation and puppets. The Times Colonist said, "It's a masterful adaptation of Lee's verse woven together to form an entire narrative." The film was released on VHS in 1991. It was released on DVD in the 10 Movie Kid's Pack Volume 3 by Echo Bridge Home Entertainment in 2011.

In 2013, celebrities in Canada read the poem Alligator Pie which was edited into a single video. The celebrities included Sarah McLachlan, Carly Rae Jepsen, Steve Nash, and Elisha Cuthbert. The video was on Amazon's Canada website first while sending one dollar donations from individual sales of Lee's books to the TD Canadian Children’s Book Week. The promotion was to "send 30 authors, illustrators, and storytellers to schools, libraries, bookstores, and community centers across Canada." It was later released on YouTube and Facebook by HarperCollins Canada.

Soulpepper Theatre Company held a musical production on stage at the Pershing Square Signature Center in 2017. The play was 55 minutes long, not including the intermission. Deb Miller of DC Metro Theater Arts said, "Soulpepper’s Alligator Pie reminds us that truly great children’s theater is great theater for all ages, so whether you’re young, or young at heart, you can’t help but love the inventiveness, enthusiasm, and talent of this superb company and the joyful tone of this delectable show."

Reception
The book's success led to Lee being named "Canada's Father Goose". The majority of children's books that are published in Canada are "classified as either pre- or post-Alligator Pie". Before Alligator Pie was published, barely any children's poetry by Canadian authors was released in Canada. The book also gave Canadian authors "the newly found confidence" to "celebrate" their country. It won the Book of the Year award from the Canadian Library Association in 1975.

Notes

References

1974 children's books
1974 poetry books
Canadian children's books
Canadian poetry collections
Children's poetry books
Fictional crocodilians